The Dominican Republic Volleyball Federation ( or FEDOVOLI) is a non-profit organization which serves as the national governing body of volleyball in the Dominican Republic.

The National Federation is recognized by the Fédération Internationale de Volleyball (FIVB) and the Dominican Republic Olympic Committee (Comité Olímpico Dominicano or COLIMDO).

Tournaments
 Dominican Republic Volleyball League
 Dominican Republic National Beach Volleyball Tour
 Superior National Tournament
 Minivoli National Tournament

Affiliated associations
 Distrito Nacional Volleyball Association
 Santo Domingo Volleyball Association
 Santiago Volleyball Association
 La Romana Volleyball Association

External links
 

National members of the North, Central America and Caribbean Volleyball Confederation
Volleyball in the Dominican Republic
Volleyball